Altass is a village in the Parish of Creich, near Lairg, Sutherland, within the Highland, Scotland and is in the council area of Highland.

References

Populated places in Sutherland